Tony Salmelainen (born August 8, 1981) is a Finnish former professional ice hockey forward. He last played for HIFK of the Finnish Liiga in 2013. He was originally drafted by the Edmonton Oilers as their second-round pick in the 1999 NHL Entry Draft. His father Tommi Salmelainen was the first European ever to be drafted by an NHL team.

Playing career
Salmelainen started his ice hockey career as a junior player in the Blues organisation, and moved to HIFK for his SM-liiga debut in the 1999-2000 season. In an eventful debut, Salmelainen scored his first goal in his very first shift, and was injured later in the game. He played 19 games for HIFK next season, and transferred to Ilves to get more ice time.

After two seasons with Ilves, Salmelainen moved to North America, where he spent three years with the Edmonton Oilers organization, playing in 13 NHL games in the 2003–04 NHL season.

When the NHL resumed play in 2005, Salmelainen returned to HIFK. He played an excellent season, including setting a personal record by scoring a five-goal, six-point night against the Pelicans in a home game on October 10, and culminating in being chosen best player of the regular season after leading the league in points and goals.

Salmelainen also made headlines during the 2005–06 season when he was sent off during a game against HPK, and threw a trashcan down the corridor to the dressing rooms in anger. After narrowly missing goaltender Jan Lundell, the trashcan accidentally hit his team's bus driver, who was injured in the face. Salmelainen was interrogated by the police and received a two-game suspension.

Salmelainen's NHL player rights were traded from the Edmonton Oilers to the Chicago Blackhawks for defenseman Jaroslav Špaček on January 26, 2006. In the summer of 2006, he signed a new contract with the Blackhawks. On June 16, 2007, he was traded, with Jassen Cullimore, to the Montreal Canadiens in exchange of Sergei Samsonov.

On August 31, 2007, the Toronto Maple Leafs signed Salmelainen to a one-year, two-way contract. On October 23, 2007, Salmelainen was suspended by the Maple Leafs for failing to comply with the terms of his contract after he had signed to play for Yaroslavl Lokomotiv of the Russian Super League for almost $1.5-million (U.S.).

After one season with Yaroslavl, Salmelainen moved to the Swiss National League A with Genève-Servette HC, where he played five seasons.

On July 29, 2013, Salmelainen returned to his first professional club, in signing a one-year contract with HIFK of his native Finland. However, he was soon forced to end his career due to a neck injury.

Career statistics

Regular season and playoffs

International

Awards
 Lasse Oksanen trophy for best player during the regular season - 2006
 Aarne Honkavaara trophy for best goal scorer during the regular season - 2006
 Veli-Pekka Ketola trophy for most points scored during the regular season - 2006

References

External links
 

1981 births
Living people
Chicago Blackhawks players
Edmonton Oilers draft picks
Edmonton Oilers players
Finnish expatriate ice hockey players in Russia
Finnish ice hockey forwards
Genève-Servette HC players
Hamilton Bulldogs (AHL) players
HIFK (ice hockey) players
Ilves players
Lausanne HC players
Lokomotiv Yaroslavl players
Sportspeople from Espoo
Toronto Marlies players
Toronto Roadrunners players